Treasure Companion is a 1996 fantasy role-playing game supplement published by Iron Crown Enterprises for Rolemaster.

Contents
Treasure Companion provides factual basics about areas such as alchemy and gemstones, and detailed sections about the use of wealth, as well as the abuse of it through tactics such as coin shaving.

Reception
David Taylor reviewed Treasure Companion for Arcane magazine, rating it a 7 out of 10 overall. Taylor comments that "It's a bit much that we need a separate supplement to deal with treasure, better coverage in the standard system would have sufficed. As the game stands, though, this Companion should settle a good few arguments. But whether you need this degree of detail will very much depend on your style of game."

References

Role-playing game supplements introduced in 1996
Rolemaster supplements